In potential theory, an area of mathematics, a double layer potential is a solution of Laplace's equation corresponding to the electrostatic or magnetic potential associated to a dipole distribution on a closed surface S in three-dimensions.  Thus a double layer potential  is a scalar-valued function of  given by

where ρ denotes the dipole distribution, ∂/∂ν denotes the directional derivative in the direction of the outward unit normal in the y variable,  and dσ is the surface measure on S.

More generally, a double layer potential is associated to a hypersurface S in n-dimensional Euclidean space by means of

where P(y) is the Newtonian kernel in n dimensions.

See also
Single layer potential
Potential theory
Electrostatics
Laplacian of the indicator

References
 .
 .
 .
 .

Potential theory